The 2022 Atlantic 10 men's basketball tournament was the postseason men's basketball tournament for the 2021–22 season of the Atlantic 10 Conference (A-10). It was held March 9–13, 2022, in Washington, D.C., at the Capital One Arena. The winner of the tournament, the Richmond Spiders, received the conference's automatic bid to the 2022 NCAA tournament.

Seeds 
All 14 A-10 schools participated in the tournament. Teams were seeded by winning percentage within the conference, with a tiebreaker system to seed teams with identical percentages. The top 10 teams received a first-round bye and the top four teams received a double-bye, automatically advancing them to the quarterfinals.

Schedule 

*Game times in Eastern Time.

Bracket

References 

Tournament
Atlantic 10 men's basketball tournament
College basketball tournaments in Washington, D.C.
Atlantic 10 men's basketball tournament
Atlantic 10 men's basketball tournament